Rock & Roll is the second studio album by Malaysian rock band from Sarawak,  the Masterpiece. It was released in 2013.

Track listing

Credits
Masterpiece
 Depha Masterpiece – vocals, songwriter
 Kennedy Edwin – guitars, vocals, backing vocals
 Willy Edwin – guitars, recording technician
 Roslee Qadir – keyboards, backing vocals
 Valentine Jimmy – keyboards
 Watt Marcus – bass guitar
 Harold Vincent – drums
Guest musicians
 Jerry Kamit – sapeh on "Nyawa Jak Tanya"
 Romy Salvador - guitar outro on "Nyaga Negeri"
Production
 Recorded at Masterjam Studio, Sibu, Malaysia
 Mixed and mastered at Norman Home Studio, Kuching
 Engineered by Norman Ading
 Artwork: Cosmas Moses Alexander
 Photography: Cosmas Moses Alexander
 Videography: Cosmas Moses Alexander
 Producer: Embat Lala, Panggau Buluh Pengerindu Records, Sibu

Awards

References

Masterpiece (band) albums
2013 albums